Olive Mary Borden (July 14, 1906 – October 1, 1947) was an American film and stage actress who began her career during the silent film era. She was nicknamed "the Joy Girl", after playing the lead in the 1927 film of that same title. Borden was known for her jet-black hair and stunning overall beauty.

At the peak of her career in the mid-1920s, Borden was earning $1,500 a week. In 1927, she walked out on her contract with Fox after refusing to take a pay cut. By 1929, her career began to wane due to her rumored reputation for being temperamental and her difficulty transitioning to sound films. She made her last film, Chloe, Love Is Calling You, in 1934 and moved on to stage work for a time. By the late 1930s, she had declared bankruptcy and stopped acting. During World War II, she joined the Women's Army Corps. She was later honorably discharged with distinction after sustaining a foot injury during service. Borden attempted a comeback in films, however, she was hindered by her alcoholism and health problems.

In 1945, she began working at the Sunshine Mission, a home for impoverished women located in the skidrow section of Los Angeles. She died there in October 1947 of a stomach ailment and pneumonia at the age of 41.

Early life
Borden was born in Richmond, Virginia on July 14, 1906. It was often erroneously reported that Sybil Tinkle was Borden's real name until the 1990s, when it was discovered that another woman had been confused with Borden. In a 1910 census report, her name is listed as Borden. Her father Harry Robinson Borden (1880–1907) died when she was a baby and she was raised by her mother Cecelia "Sibbie" Shields (1884–1959) in Norfolk, Virginia, and Baltimore, Maryland, where she attended Catholic boarding schools. Through her father, she was a fourth cousin of Lizzie Borden. As a teenager, she persuaded her mother to take her to Hollywood to pursue a career in show business. To support themselves they opened a candy store and Olive worked as a telephone operator.

Career

Borden began her career as one of the Sennett Bathing Beauties in 1922 and was soon appearing as a vamp in Hal Roach comedy shorts. Producer Paul Bern chose her for an uncredited role in his film The Dressmaker from Paris (1925). She was signed by Fox after being named a WAMPAS Baby Star in 1925 (along with her cousin, Natalie Joyce). Borden quickly became one of their most popular and highest paid stars earning a salary of $1,500 a week. She had starring roles in eleven films at Fox, including 3 Bad Men and Fig Leaves, both of which costarred her then-boyfriend George O'Brien. 3 Bad Men has also been featured at the Museum of Modern Art. During this time she worked with some directors who would go on to achieve major fame, including John Ford, Howard Hawks, and Leo McCarey. 

Paramount Studios began a policy of 10% paycuts on any salary over $50 to recoup production costs, when Fox tried the same and cut her salary in 1927, Borden left the studio. By this point she was a major silent film star. In making the transition to "talkies" she worked with a voice coach (to suppress her Southern accent). She was less successful, but still remained in demand as an actress, continuing to work for Columbia and RKO. She had cut her trademark hair into a short bob, and turned herself into a modern flapper. But Borden had trouble with the new look, losing her identity; she couldn't find her audience and this confused her waning public. 

She made few movies in the early 1930s and her once promising career stalled, producing but one picture in 1932 (The Divorce Racket), and three in 1933 (Leave it to Me, Hotel Variety, and The Mild West). Her last screen credit came in the 1934 film Chloe, Love Is Calling You, where she played a woman kidnapped at birth and raised as a child of mixed race. Some say that this once-lost film "is so bad it should've stayed lost." A pre-code movie made under Will Hays, it had little box office success and in some states (mostly southern) it was banned at the time of its release. Borden then moved to New York, where she had a brief stage career, and made a living on the waning vaudeville circuit.

Later years
During her acting career, Borden was one of the highest paid stars. She spent her money freely and by the late 1930s, she was broke. Borden then found work as a postal clerk and mail carrier and also worked as a nurse's aide. In December 1942, Borden joined the Women's Army Corps (the Women's Army Corps, the only non-Nurse Corps element that women could serve in the Army at that time) where she served as an ambulance driver and received an Army citation for bravery in turning over an enemy ammunition truck. Her Army career ended in 1944, with an honorable discharge after she was hospitalized in Walter Reed Medical Center with a severe foot injury. After her discharge, she attempted an unsuccessful comeback in films.

Borden struggled with alcoholism and numerous health problems. She spent her final years in the skid row section of Los Angeles working and living at the Sunshine Mission, a home for women alongside her mother Sibbie, who got Borden the work.

Personal life
Borden had several relationships with men, in and out of the motion picture industry. For the majority of her life, she lived with her mother, Sibbie, who was known as a "stage mother", helping Borden with most decisions and spending of money until Borden's death. From 1926 to 1930, Borden was romantically involved with actor George O'Brien and the press reported they were engaged. She also dated director Marshall Neilan, producer Paul Bern, and had a long affair with Arthur Benline, a Lieutenant Commander in the Navy Construction Battalion.

Borden was married twice. Her first marriage was to stockbroker Theodore Spector, whom she married on March 28, 1931, in Harrison, New York. The marriage was rocky from the start, and the couple separated in early 1932 after news of scandal broke that she was involved in a love triangle. Spector had not divorced his first wife, Pearl, whom he married in 1919, and he was arrested for bigamy after his first wife came forward and claimed they were still married. In November 1932, Borden petitioned the court for an annulment, which was granted on November 22. Spector was ultimately cleared of bigamy, but Borden had the marriage annulled, moved on from the entire incident. She married her second husband, 26-year-old railroad technician, John Moeller, in November 1934 under the pseudonym Mary Borden. That marriage ended in divorce seven years later.

Death
Borden died on October 1, 1947, from complications of pneumonia at the age of 41. The only possession she had when she died was a signed photo of herself. Borden's funeral was held on October 3 at the Sunshine Mission home for women, where she had worked and lived since 1945. The mission's founder, Essie Binkley West, officiated at the service. Borden was buried at Forest Lawn Memorial Park in Glendale, California. Her mother was interred in the grave next to her when she died of a heart attack in 1959.

For her contributions to the film industry, Borden has a motion pictures star on the Hollywood Walk of Fame at 6801 Hollywood Boulevard. She was one of the first eight stars chosen to receive a star in 1958.

Selected filmography

Footnotes

Works cited

Ankerich, Michael G. (2010). Dangerous Curves Atop Hollywood Heels: The Lives, Careers, and Misfortunes of 14 Hard-Luck Girls of the Silent Screen. BearManor.

External links

Olive Borden at Virtual History

1906 births
1947 deaths
20th-century American actresses
Actresses from Virginia
American film actresses
American silent film actresses
American stage actresses
Deaths from pneumonia in California
Actors from Norfolk, Virginia
Vaudeville performers
Actresses from Baltimore
WAMPAS Baby Stars
Women's Army Corps soldiers